I is the debut extended play by South Korean singer Taeyeon, released on October 7, 2015, by SM Entertainment. The EP was recorded at SM Studios in Seoul, South Korea, and was produced by Lee Soo-man.

Background and release
In mid-2015, S.M. Entertainment announced that Taeyeon would release her first solo album later that year. The album's title track, "I", features popular rapper Verbal Jint and includes lyrics written by Taeyeon. The album was released via digital music websites at midnight on October 7, the physical copies sold in the stores on same day.

Due to her previous success recording ballads for Korean films and televisions, the public expected Taeyeon to promote the album with a ballad title track. The singer, however, chose a pop rock song and expressed that she wanted to "make [her] solo debut with good songs regardless of their genres." Discussing about her music styles for the album, Taeyeon noted that she purposely avoided "way over the top" songs, elaborating:
I tried not to be excessive. I tried to sing in more plain and light ways. I have to sing from the beginning to the end all by myself, so I should feel comfortable. So I didn't choose such reckless songs [flowery or high-pitched], and tried to avoid challenging, something too new.

Music and lyrics 
Lee Su-ho from South Korean online magazine IZM described I as a pop rock album with a balladic production. Meanwhile, Chester Chin from Malaysian newspaper The Star noted elements of soft rock on the EP, a genre that is contrary to Girls' Generation's common bubblegum pop and electronic sound.

Reception

Upon its release, I received generally positive reviews from music critics. Lee Su-ho from South Korean online magazine IZM praised the EP's pop rock and balladic musical styles; they further hailed I for showcasing Taeyeon as a talented vocalist. Chester Chin from The Star labelled the album as "a collection of dynamic K-pop confections" with "refreshing" elements of soft rock as opposed to Girls' Generation's signature bubblegum and electronic sound. He further deemed it as "a reflection of Taeyeon’s strength as a vocalist."

I was a commercial success in the singer's native country South Korea. It debuted at number two on the Gaon Album Chart for the week ending October 10, 2015. The following week, its position on the chart dropped one position to number three. The EP remained on the third position for a further week before dropping to number five on the chart issue dated October 25–31, 2015. Despite only charting at number two on the weekly chart, I was the best-selling album on the Gaon Album Chart of October with 100,923 physical units sold, and the fourteenth highest-selling album of November with an additional 10,098 copies sold. It became the sixteenth best-selling album of 2015 in South Korea, with sales figures standing at 119,576 copies. According to the Korea Music Contents Industry Association, I was the main contributor which helped SM Entertainment top digital music sales in South Korea during the fourth quarter of 2015.

The EP entered the Billboard World Albums and Heatseeker charts at number one and five, respectively, selling 2,000 copies in the first two days of its release in the United States. Additionally, I charted at number twenty-one on the Japanese Oricon Albums Chart.

Track listing
Credits are adapted from Naver.

Charts

Weekly charts

Year-end charts

Release history

References 

SM Entertainment EPs
Korean-language EPs
2015 debut EPs
Pop rock EPs
Taeyeon EPs